Götterdämmerung is an 1876 opera by Richard Wagner, the last in his cycle of four music dramas titled Der Ring des Nibelungen.

Götterdämmerung may also refer to:

Götterdämmerung (Megaherz album), 2012 German industrial metal band Megaherz
GötterDÄmmerung (Die Ärzte tribute album), 1997 tribute album to the German punk band Die Ärzte
The giant space battleship of the Fourth Reich in the 2012 film Iron Sky
”Götterdämmerung” a song on the album Zeal & Ardor by metal band Zeal & Ardor